The Tunisia national under-15 football team, nicknamed Les Aigles de Carthage (The Eagles of Carthage or The Carthage Eagles), is the national under-15 football team of Tunisia and is controlled by the Tunisian Football Federation. The team competes in the UNAF U-15 Tournament.

Honours 
 UNAF U-15 Tournament:
 Champions (1):  2017 (Morocco)
 3rd Place (2):  2018 (Algeria), 2018 (Tunisia)

Tournament Records
 Champions   Runners-up   Third place   Fourth place

Red border color indicates tournament was held on home soil.

Youth Olympic Games record

Danone Nations Cup

UNAF U-15 Tournament record

See also 
 Tunisia national football team
 Tunisia A' national football team
 Tunisia national under-23 football team
 Tunisia national under-20 football team
 Tunisia national under-17 football team

External links 
   - official site of FTF

under-15
African national under-15 association football teams